Michał Janicki (born 29 September 1982 in Słomniki) is a Polish former professional footballer who played as a striker. He spent two seasons in the Bundesliga with VfL Wolfsburg.

Personal life
In 2018 he played for English non-league club PFC Victoria London.

References

External links
 

1982 births
Living people
People from Kraków County
Sportspeople from Lesser Poland Voivodeship
Association football forwards
Polish footballers
Poland youth international footballers
Polish expatriate footballers
Expatriate footballers in England
Expatriate footballers in Germany
Polonia Warsaw players
VfL Wolfsburg players
VfL Wolfsburg II players
Eintracht Braunschweig players
Eintracht Braunschweig II players
Zagłębie Sosnowiec players
Stal Stalowa Wola players
FC Gütersloh 2000 players
Hutnik Nowa Huta players
PFC Victoria London players
Bundesliga players
2. Bundesliga players